Bangladesh Air Force Academy (BAFA) is a training and education academy which provides initial training to all men and women who are preparing to be officers in the Bangladesh Air Force. The Bangladesh Air Force Academy is located in the district town of Jashore at Matiur Rahman Air Force Base. An air officer (e.g. an Air Commodore) serves as its Commandant.

History 
The academy traces its origin to the Cadet Training Unit of Bangladesh which was formed in November 1973. In April 1977 it was moved to Jashore and renamed Cadet Training Wing. In April 1982 it was made a full academy and renamed Bangladesh Air Force Academy.

Selection of officers 

Suitable candidates are selected after passing through different selection phases. For regular courses of different branch cadets, the selection procedure is as follows:

 Preliminary written Test on IQ, English, Physics & Mathematics.
 Preliminary VIVA & Medical Test.
 ISSB board for four days.
 Final Medical Test 
 Final Selection Exam for GD(P) & Engineering branch.
 Final Interview at Air HQ.

Selection criteria for BAF candidates are highest among armed forces branches and only the best candidates are selected as air force cadets.

Training system 

Newly recruited cadets undergo three years of training before they receive a commission. Initially, BAF cadets join the Bangladesh Military Academy for a tenure of three months, where they undergo initial training with army and navy cadets. Following initial training, they return to their academy and join the Bangladesh Air Force Academy. At the academy, cadets receive general service training, armed combat training and education on different service-related subjects. The period at the academy is divided into four terms. For the first two terms, cadets only receive general service training and read service-related subjects. During the third term, the General Duties Branch cadets go for 120 hours basic flying training and other branches' cadets begin studying subjects such as engineering. After successful completion of three years training in the Bangladesh Air Force Academy, cadets are commissioned into different branches of the Bangladesh Air Force. Those branches are Administration, General Duty (Pilot) [{GD(P)}], Maintenance (Technical Engineering), Maintenance (Technical Communication and Electronics), Maintenance (Technical Armament), Air Defence Weapon Control (ADWC), Logistics, Air Traffic Control (ATC), Education, Legal, Accounts, Meteorology etc. A flight cadet also earns a BSc degree in Aeronautics from the Bangladesh University of Professionals.

Gallery

See also
 Bangladesh Military Academy
 Bangladesh Naval Academy

References

External links 
Bangladesh Air Force website
Bangladesh Air Force Academy website

Air force academies
Bangladesh Air Force
Bangladesh University of Professionals
Educational institutions established in 1973
Bangladesh Armed Forces education and training establishments